Dai Woodham, MBE, BEM (5 September 1919 – 12 September 1994), born David Lloyd Victor Woodham, is remembered by many steam railway enthusiasts as the man who saved over 200 former British Railways steam locomotives from the scrap heap. Many of these were purchased by preserved railways and locomotive preservation groups and are now in active operation, including some permitted to haul passenger trains on the main line system.

His family owned Woodham Brothers scrapyard in Barry Docks, Barry, Wales.  In the 1930s, the Woodhams started to trade in scrap metal, and in 1957, the company began dismantling railway wagons as a result of the 1955 Modernisation Plan. This sought to reduce the British Railways wagon fleet from over one million to just 600,000 and to scrap and replace around 16,000 remaining steam locomotives with new 'standard' designs as well as diesel and electric powered types.

Dai Woodham was awarded the MBE in 1987 in recognition of a number of business initiatives which helped to create many jobs in the Barry Docks area.  Dai already held the British Empire Medal for bravery while serving with the Royal Artillery in Italy in World War II.

In 1994, Dai Woodham was diagnosed with lung cancer; he died on 12 September that year.

1919 births
1994 deaths
20th-century Welsh businesspeople
British people associated with Heritage Railways
Members of the Order of the British Empire
Deaths from lung cancer in England
Recipients of the British Empire Medal
Royal Artillery personnel
British Army personnel of World War II